The Orlando Nighthawks were a soccer club that competed in the USL Premier Development League from 1997 to 1999. The club started as the Daytona Tigers and became the Orlando Nighthawks in 1998. The team's head coach was Steve Richards. He was assisted by Gerry Queen. The team's general manager was Azi Khan. Khan died halfway through the 1998 season. Following Khan's death and a lack of commitment on the part of New Jersey-based owner Phil Neto, the team returned with a depleted squad due to other players signing off to play for the Central Florida Kraze and Cocoa Expos and only won one game. Following the season, the team folded.

Year-by-year

USL Second Division teams
Defunct Premier Development League teams
Defunct soccer clubs in Florida
Soccer clubs in Orlando, Florida
1998 establishments in Florida
1999 disestablishments in Florida
Association football clubs established in 1998
Association football clubs disestablished in 1999